The Battle of Grimball's Landing took place in James Island, South Carolina, on 16 July 1863, during the American Civil War. It was a part of the campaign known as Operations Against the Defenses of Charleston.

Opposing forces

Union

Confederate

Battle

To draw Confederate forces away from reinforcing Fort Wagner, Brig. Gen. Quincy A. Gillmore designed two feints. One force was sent up Stono River to threaten the Charleston & Savannah Railroad bridge. A second force, consisting of Alfred Terry's division, landed on James Island on 8 July. Soon, Terry demonstrated his forces before the Confederate defenses but did not launch an attack.

On 11 July Gillmore made his move on Fort Wagner. The attack was made by the 7th Connecticut Infantry. Supported by a heavy naval bombardment, the assault jumped off at dawn, moving forward through a thick morning fog which helped to conceal their advance. The attackers were met with stiff resistance and were forced back with heavy losses. The regiment lost 339 men, with 123 wounded, 49 killed, and 167 missing. Against this the defenders suffered 12 casualties. Gillmore considered his next move.

Meanwhile, the Confederates moved against James Island. On 16 July they attacked, with the goal of encircling and destroying a part of the Union forces there. The men of the 10th Connecticut Infantry were in an exposed position, and in jeopardy of being cut off. The Confederate efforts to get around them were checked by the men of the 54th Massachusetts, who rebuffed a series of attacks while the 10th Connecticut was withdrawn. The 54th suffered 43 casualties, with 14 killed, 17 wounded, and 12 others lost to capture, but the 10th Connecticut was saved. The following day the Union forces were pulled off the island.

This battle was the first engagement of the 54th Massachusetts Infantry Regiment.

A letter to his wife written two days later by First Sergeant Robert John Simmons (a British citizen from Bermuda, who had previously served in the British Army) shortly before the attack on Battery Wagner was published in the New York Tribune on the 23rd of December, 1863, giving a first-hand account of the action.

(At roughly the same time as the events that First Sergeant Simmons described took place, his seven-year-old nephew was murdered in New York during the four days of race riots that followed the 13 July.)

See also
 Battle of Secessionville (1862), a.k.a. Battle of James Island
 Battle of Grimball's Causeway (1865)

Notes

References

 CWSAC Report Update

Further reading
 Burton, E. Milby. The Siege of Charleston 1861–1865. Columbia: University of South Carolina Press, 1970. .
 Kennedy, Frances H., ed. The Civil War Battlefield Guide. 2nd ed. Boston: Houghton Mifflin Co., 1998. .
 Reed, Rowena. Combined Operations in the Civil War. Annapolis, MD: Naval Institute Press, 1978. .
 Wise, Stephen R. Gate of Hell: Campaign for Charleston Harbor, 1863. Columbia: University of South Carolina Press, 1994. .

Battles of the Lower Seaboard Theater and Gulf Approach of the American Civil War
Operations against the Defenses of Charleston (American Civil War)
Battle of Grimball's Landing
Battle of Grimball's Landing
Inconclusive battles of the American Civil War
Battles of the American Civil War in South Carolina
Conflicts in 1863
1863 in South Carolina
July 1863 events
19th-century in Charleston, South Carolina